The Freightliner Cascadia is a heavy-duty semi-trailer truck produced by Freightliner Trucks. Its design took fuel efficiency into great consideration, As well as having improved upon several other features including the powertrain offerings, sound mitigation, safety systems, and overall mechanical reliability from its predecessors. It is offered in three basic configurations: Day Cab, Mid-Roof XT, and Raised Roof. The latter two models are sleeper cabs, offered in various lengths ranging from 48 to 72 inches (Raised Roof models available for 60” or 72” lengths only). The Cascadia was sold chiefly in North America until 2020, when an export, primarily geared towards the Australian and New Zealand markets, was introduced. Prior to the introduction of the export variant, its place remained occupied by the Freightliner Century (no longer in US production) for export markets.

Cascadia Evolution
The Cascadia Evolution is a more fuel-efficient version of the Cascadia, released in 2013. Improvements were made to both the aerodynamics and the comfort of the driver. The instrument cluster was redesigned to be easier to read, the seats have improved back and lumbar support, dashboard switches are repositioned with larger, higher contrast text, and a battery-powered auxiliary HVAC system from Thermo King was offered. This system was designed to reduce overnight engine idling, both saving fuel and reducing noise while drivers are asleep.

2017 facelift

In 2017, the Cascadia received a major design revision for the 2018 model year. The general design of the body is the same except for revised chassis fairings and longer cab extenders. The 2018 Cascadia's facelift consisted of hood cowl with a more sculpted and aggressive design, synchronized by the redesigned front bumper and larger grille with an addition of all-LED headlights. The hood mirrors were more aerodynamic, following the fuel efficiency design flow and improved bumper air dams were installed.

Interior wise, the truck received a complete overhaul. An all-new dashboard and new, even more, ergonomic seats both make the truck very driver-centric and provide superior visibility. The Cascadia's sleeper contains a larger bunk, redesigned storage cabinets, new, aircraft-inspired dimmable LED ceiling lights; standard in raised roof sleepers; and the available "Driver's Loft" feature, which adds a collapsible table and two collapsible seats, all of which stow underneath an extra-wide Murphy-style bunk. If equipped with an upper bunk, the raised roof sleeper also includes a standard telescopic ladder for easier access to the top bunk.

Battery-powered HVAC systems remain an option, however, in addition to the Thermo King units seen on the Cascadia Evolution, Freightliner now offers an internally manufactured equivalent system as well.

Other features of the truck include the Detroit DT12 automated manual transmission, ultra-quiet door and window seals, a single panel windshield, all LED marker lights and taillights, and a suite of active and passive safety systems, including blind-spot monitoring, collision mitigation system, lane-keeping assistance, and more.

The second-generation Cascadia is produced in the same three configurations as its predecessors, Day Cab, Mid-roof XT, and Raised Roof.

eCascadia

The eCascadia is an all-electric truck variant of the Cascadia.

In August 2019, the first two eCascadias were delivered to customers in California as part of field tests. The manufacturer stated that the trucks are built "to test the integration of battery-electric trucks [into] large-scale fleet operations". One of the customers, Penske, will be operating the truck "in regional traffic in Southern California" while the other, NFI, will use it in drayage operations at the Port of Los Angeles and the Port of Long Beach.

Order books opened in 2021, and one order were for 800 trucks.

See also
 Freightliner Business Class M2, the eM2, another all-electric variant available from Freightliner
 Tesla Semi, another all-electric class-8 semi-tractor

References

 http://www.daimler-trucksnorthamerica.com/news/press-release-detail.aspx#detroit-dt12-automated-manual-transmission-now-2013-09-18, Giroux, David, "Detroit DT12 Automated Manual Transmission Now Available for Detroit DD13 Engine", 09/18/2013

External links

 Freightliner, 2017 Cascadia
 Freightliner, Cascadia Evolution
 Detroit DT12

Cascadia
Class 8 trucks
Tractor units
Vehicles introduced in 2007
Vehicles introduced in 2008